The Pharmacogenomics Journal is a quarterly peer-reviewed medical journal covering pharmacogenomics. It was established in 2001 and is published by Nature Publishing Group. The editor-in-chief is George P. Patrinos (University of Patras). According to the Journal Citation Reports, the journal had a 2020 impact factor of 3.550.

References

External links 

Pharmacology journals
Nature Research academic journals
Publications established in 2001
Quarterly journals
English-language journals